Destination: Beautiful is the full-length debut album by American the alternative/indie band Mae. It was released on February 25, 2003, on Tooth & Nail Records.

In 2012 Spartan Records created a vinyl record of Destination: Beautiful. Later a 2nd and 3rd pressing followed all of which sold out.

Track listing
 "Embers and Envelopes" (Gimenez) – 4:18
 "This Time Is the Last Time" (Gimenez) – 3:50
 "All Deliberate Speed" (Gimenez) – 5:09
 "Runaway" (Gimenez) – 3:45
 "Sun" (Gimenez) – 5:08
 "Last Call" (Gimenez, Marshall) – 3:35
 "Skyline Drive" (Gimenez) – 5:59
 "Soundtrack for Our Movie" (Gimenez) – 3:13
 "Summertime" (Gimenez, Marshall, Mae) – 4:06
 "Giving It Away" (Gimenez) – 5:27
 "Goodbye, Goodnight" (Gimenez) – 4:48

Personnel 

William Clark – bass
Alan Douches – mastering
John T. Frazier – A&R
Chad Johnson – A&R
Mae – producer, engineer, art direction, mixing
Tim Owen – photography

References 

Mae albums
2003 debut albums
Tooth & Nail Records albums